Fuji-Cola is a soft drink created to promote Alberto Fujimori, a former President of Peru. The drink was created by his supporters to promote and fund his campaign for the vote in 2006. Kenji Fujimori, Alberto's son, has applied for a trademark on the name.

External links
BBC article on Fuji-Cola

Political history of Peru
Cola brands
Peruvian drinks